The siege of Trebizond in April 1282 was an unsuccessful siege of Trebizond, the capital of the Empire of Trebizond, by the Georgian king David I of Imereti. Little is known about the attack, but it may have relied on support within the Trapezuntine aristocracy, which opposed the rapprochement of Emperor John II of Trebizond (reigned 1280–1297) with the Palaiologan Byzantine court at Constantinople. Though King David failed to take the city, the Georgians occupied several provinces.

Sources

References 

Trebizond
Trebizond 1282
Trebizond 1282
Trebizond 1282
History of Trabzon
Trebizond
1282 in Asia
1282 in Europe
13th century in the Kingdom of Georgia